Mustapha Oluwatosin Olagunju (born 1 January 2002) is an English professional footballer who plays as a centre-back for  side Huddersfield Town. He has also played on loan for Tadcaster Albion, Welling United and Port Vale.

Career
Born in Plumstead, London, Olagunju started his football career at the XYZ Academy, before moving to Kent Football United and then Huddersfield Town after impressing the "Terriers" in a trial game against Barnsley. He joined Huddersfield as an attacking midfielder but was converted to playing at centre-back under the stewardship of Leigh Bromby and Emyr Humphreys. He was promoted into Dean Whitehead's U19 team after starting 31 games for the U17 side. He turned professional at the club in August 2019, signing a two-year contract. Manager Danny Cowley invited him to train with the first-team at a camp in Dubai in November 2019.

On 10 January 2020, he moved to Tadcaster Albion of the Northern Premier League Division One West on a one-month loan to gain first team experience. He started two games for the "Brewers". He joined Welling United on loan on 30 October 2020, along with Jaheim Headley. He made his National League South debut the next day in a 2–1 defeat at Eastbourne Borough. He played a total of seven games for the "Wings".

Olagunju made his senior debut for Huddersfield Town on 9 January 2021, when he started in their 3–2 FA Cup Third Round defeat to Plymouth Argyle at Kirklees Stadium after manager Carlos Corberán rested all 11 players who started the previous Championship fixture. He was booked in the fifth minute and substituted after 77 minutes. On 1 February 2021, he joined League Two side Port Vale on loan until the end of the 2020–21 season. He made his EFL debut on 20 February, in a 1–1 draw at Leyton Orient, and manager Darrell Clarke said that "he did all right". In April 2021, he signed a new contract at Huddersfield Town to keep him at the club until June 2024.

Style of play
Olagunju is an aggressive centre-back who plays on the front-foot and is comfortable in possession.

Personal life
Born in England, Olagunju is of Nigerian descent.

Career statistics

References

2002 births
Living people
Footballers from Greater London
English footballers
English people of Nigerian descent
Association football midfielders
Kent Football United F.C. players
Huddersfield Town A.F.C. players
Tadcaster Albion A.F.C. players
Port Vale F.C. players
Welling United F.C. players
Northern Premier League players
National League (English football) players
English Football League players
Black British sportspeople